aka Torasan's Journey with a Lady is a 1983 Japanese comedy film directed by Yoji Yamada. It stars Kiyoshi Atsumi as Torajirō Kuruma (Tora-san), and Harumi Miyako as his love interest or "Madonna". Tora-san's Song of Love is the thirty-first entry in the popular, long-running Otoko wa Tsurai yo series.

Synopsis
Tora-san returns to his family home to learn that his brother-in-law cannot go to Mitsuo's (Tora-san's nephew) athletic event. Tora-san volunteers to take his place, but gets into an argument with his brother-in-law's boss and returns to the road. He meets a young woman in Niigata who, unbeknownst to him, is a popular enka singer.

Cast
 Kiyoshi Atsumi as Torajirō
 Chieko Baisho as Sakura
 Harumi Miyako as Harumi Kyo
 Shimojo Masami as Kuruma Tatsuzō
 Chieko Misaki as Tsune Kuruma (Torajiro's aunt)
 Gin Maeda as Hiroshi Suwa
 Hisao Dazai as Boss (Umetarō Katsura)
 Gajirō Satō as Genkō
 Hidetaka Yoshioka as Mitsuo Suwa
 Chishū Ryū as Gozen-sama
 Takuya Fujioka as  Kitamura
 Senri Sakurai as Mita
 Bengal as Yoshioka
 Noko Konoha as Tomiko
 Chieko Nakakita as Hisako Shōji

Critical appraisal
Stuart Galbraith IV considers Tora-san's Song of Love to be a minor entry in the Otoko wa Tsurai yo series. The German-language site molodezhnaja gives Tora-san's Song of Love three and a half out of five stars.

Availability
Tora-san's Song of Love was released theatrically on August 6, 1983. In Japan, the film was released on videotape in 1996, and in DVD format in 2002 and 2008.

References

Bibliography

English

German

Japanese

External links
 Tora-san's Song of Love at www.tora-san.jp (official site)

1983 films
1983 comedy films
Films directed by Yoji Yamada
1980s Japanese-language films
Otoko wa Tsurai yo films
Shochiku films
Films with screenplays by Yôji Yamada
Japanese sequel films
1980s Japanese films